Vykhino:

 Vykhino-Zhulebino, a district of Moscow
 Vykhino (Moscow Metro)
 Vykhino (locomotive depot) - a locomotive depot of Tagansko-Krasnopresnenskaya Line
 Vykhino (railroad station) - a railroad station of Moscow-Ryazan Railway of Moscow Railway